Otay Ranch Town Center is an open-air shopping mall/lifestyle center in the Otay Ranch area of Chula Vista, California, south of San Diego. Owned and operated by Brookfield Properties with Anchor stores like AMC Theatres, Barnes & Noble, Planet Fitness, and Macy's.

Other retailers include Apple Inc., H&M, and Hollister Co. Dining options include The Cheesecake Factory, Chili's and P.F. Chang's China Bistro.

History

2000s

Otay Ranch Town Center opened on October 27, 2006 with anchors, Borders Books & Music, Macy's, REI, and AMC theaters. There is also a power center east of the mall with big box retailers like Best Buy and Ulta Beauty and a few restaurants. 

The Mall had originally been planned to be a high-end mall attracting additional anchors like Nordstrom. Due to the financial crisis of 2007–2008, those plans were changed, and the site is now a soccer field.

In 2007, Borders Group moved to (nearby competing mall) Westfield Plaza Bonita and was replaced with Barnes & Noble.

2010s
Since 2010, many national chain stores including Gap, Anthropologie, Justice, Banana Republic closed. As more stores and eateries closed, Chula Vista Library opened a branch in the food pavilion in 2012 replacing the vacant Geppettos and three eateries to attract more foot traffic at the center. Around 2012, Party City and Designer Shoe Warehouse opened stores at the east end of the mall.

In 2017, Recreational Equipment, Inc. did not renew its lease and shuttered their location, and in 2018, Planet Fitness took its place. In 2018 and 2019 new eateries opened in the south parking lot including Panera and Jack in the Box. In 2019, MTS had a Rapid Bus Route 225 stop built for Otay Ranch Town Center. This new bus route also brought with it a new bridge over SR 125, which meant that residents of the Santa Venetia area could have direct access to the town center.

2020s
In 2020, a Barons Market opened in the former DSW location after they had relocated to the former Gap location/ Toys “R” Us express. Also in 2020 the lease of the Library Branch had been extended to 2023. As of 2021 Brookfield Properties announced a reimagination of the town center, making it into a mixed-use development adding many more apartment complexes to what is the current surrounding parking-lot areas (which originally had been planned to be retail spaces in a future extension) as well as “pedestrian-friendly green spaces”. They mentioned that there are no plans to alter retail at the existing Town Center, but the project will help bring in much more foot traffic into the mall much like the few years when the town center had first opened.

Mall features
 The mall hosts a farmer's market every Tuesday afternoon
 Dog park
 Pet-friendly shopping center
 Family-friendly shopping center, with water fountains for children and artificial grass area
 Has an annual tree lighting with Christmas entertainment

See also
 Westfield Plaza Bonita
 Chula Vista Center
 Las Americas Premium Outlets
 Fashion Valley Mall

References

External links
 

2006 establishments in California
Shopping malls in San Diego County, California
Brookfield Properties
Shopping malls established in 2006
Ersatz downtowns